Laval—Les Îles is a federal electoral district in Quebec, Canada, that has been represented in the House of Commons of Canada since 2004.

Its population in 2001 was 100,137.

Of the population, 15.9% are Christian Orthodox, and 14.0% are of Greek ethnic origin, both the highest such percentages in Canada.

Geography
The district includes the neighbourhoods of Îles-Laval, Laval-Ouest, Laval-sur-le-Lac, Sainte-Dorothée, the western part of the neighbourhood of Fabreville and the western part of Chomedey in the City of Laval. The neighbouring ridings are Vimy, Saint-Laurent—Cartierville, Pierrefonds—Dollard, Rivière-des-Mille-Îles, and Marc-Aurèle-Fortin.

Demographics

According to the Canada 2011 Census

 Mother tongue: French (48%), English (10%), Greek (9%), Arabic (7%), Armenian (4%)

History
The electoral district was created in 2003 from parts of Laval West riding.

This riding lost territory to Vimy and Marc-Aurèle-Fortin during the 2012 electoral redistribution.

This riding has elected the following Members of Parliament:

Election results

See also
 List of Canadian federal electoral districts
 Past Canadian electoral districts

References

Campaign expense data from Elections Canada
2011 Results from Elections Canada
Riding history from the Library of Parliament

Notes

Politics of Laval, Quebec
Quebec federal electoral districts
2003 establishments in Quebec